Amartus tinctus is a species of short-winged flower beetle in the family Kateretidae. It is found in Central America and North America.

References

Further reading

 
 
 

Kateretidae
Articles created by Qbugbot
Beetles described in 1843